Basanta Basnet is a Nepalese journalist and writer. He is an editor at Onlinekhabar, an online news portal. He started working at Onlinekhabar since 17 July 2022, after resigning from Shilapatra. Earlier, He worked at Kantipur National Daily as a political correspondent. He was also an editor at Nepal Magazine, which used to be published by Kantipur Publications.

Journalism 
He was the former editor at Nepal Magazine and Shilapatra, an online news portal. He was the editor-in-chief of Shilapatra from August 31, 2020 to July 2022. He has also worked for various national dailies such as Kantipur, Annapurna Today, Annapurna Post and Nagarik.

Books 
He has published two books. His first book 72 ko Bismay was published on 8 September 2018. The book is a political non-fiction about the 2015 Nepal earthquake and the events that followed after the promulgation of the constitution of Nepal in 2015 (2072 BS).

His second book, Mahabhara is a novel set in eastern Nepal during the Nepalese Civil War. It was published on 8 January 2022 by FinePrint Publication.

References 

21st-century Nepalese writers
Nepalese non-fiction writers
Nepalese male novelists
Year of birth missing (living people)
Living people
Alumni of Pokhara University
Nepalese political journalists
Khas people
21st-century Nepalese male writers
Nepalese journalists